Jagiełło or Jagiello may refer to:

People
 Władysław II Jagiełło (c. 1348–1434), also known as Ladislaus II, Vladislaus II, or Jogaila, king of Poland and grand duke of Lithuania 
 The Jagiellon dynasty or any of its members
 Aleksander Jagiełło, Polish footballer
 Eugeniusz Jagiełło (1873–1947), Polish politician
 Filip Jagiełło (b. 1997), Polish footballer
 Jarosław Jagiełło (born 1971), Polish politician 
 Ladislaus Jagiello (disambiguation)
 Walter Jagiello (1930–2006), American polka musician

Other
 Jagiełło Oak (c. 1524–1974), an oak tree in the Białowieża Forest
 Jagiello, a junior synonym of the butterfly genus Timaeta
 , a passenger ship in service 1947-49

See also